Giovanni or Jean Cossa (probably 29 March 1400 - 30 October 1476) was lieutenant general of Provence, seneschal of Rene of Anjou and grand seneschal of Provence.

Life

See also
 Martyrdom of Saint Maurice and his Comrades

References

Bibliography 
  
 

People from the Province of Naples
1400 births
1476 deaths
15th-century Italian nobility